Madison Roswell Smith (July 9, 1850 – June 18, 1919) was a United States Representative from Missouri.

Biography
Born on a farm near Glenallen, Missouri, Smith attended public schools and Central College in Fayette, Missouri. He taught school and studied law, being admitted to the bar in 1874. He began the practice of law at Marble Hill, Missouri, in 1877 and served as the prosecuting attorney of Bollinger County from 1878 to 1882.

He served in the state Senate from 1884 to 1888. He declined to be a candidate for re-election.

He served as editor of reports for the St. Louis court of appeals for four years and resigned. He served as delegate to the Democratic National Conventions in 1896 and 1912.

Smith was elected as a Democrat to the Sixtieth Congress (March 4, 1907 – March 3, 1909). He was an unsuccessful candidate for re-election in 1908 to the Sixty-first Congress.

He then organized and served as secretary of the Federal Trust Co. of St. Louis from 1909 to 1912. He was the U.S. Minister to Haiti from 1912 until his resignation in 1914. He continued the practice of his profession in Farmington, Missouri, where he died on June 18, 1919. He was interred in the Masonic Cemetery. In 2011 Smith's tombstone was desecrated. Police continue to resolve this act as an unsolved crime as of 2017.

References

External links 
 

1850 births
1919 deaths
Burials in Missouri
Missouri lawyers
Democratic Party Missouri state senators
Ambassadors of the United States to Haiti
Democratic Party members of the United States House of Representatives from Missouri
19th-century American politicians
People from Bollinger County, Missouri
19th-century American lawyers
20th-century American diplomats